Abezethibou, Abezethibod, or Abezi-Thibod is a demon and fallen angel described in the pseudepigrapha Testament of Solomon. He followed Beelzebub upon his fall from heaven, and became an important demon in Hell. However, after his treason, he is left with one red wing. He later travelled to Egypt where he hardened the heart of Pharaoh and his advisors, and convinced them to pursue the fleeing Israelite slaves. In doing so, he drowns along with the army in the Red Sea, and becomes trapped in a pillar of water, though Beelzebub claims he will return for conquest.

Depiction in the Testament of Solomon 
In the Testament of Solomon, when Solomon summons Beelzebub for an interview, the prince of the demons reveals that an angel named Abezethibou accompanied him when he fell from Heaven. After his fall, Abezethibou became a one-winged demon condemned to hell. He claims that all those imprisoned in Tartarus fall under Abezethibou's control. This charge comprised Abezethibou's primary role and burden in the demon world. He opposed Moses and the Israelites during the Exodus from Egypt.

Later, Abezethibou himself appears before Solomon, informing the king that, as an angel, Abezethibou had sat in Amelouth, a place he described as the "first Heaven". After his fall, Abezethibou roamed Egypt, and, after the appeal of Moses to let the Israelites leave Egypt, cause Pharaoh's heart to harden. This is contrary to the traditional Christian view of the event based on the Book of Exodus, which contends that God hardened the heart of Pharaoh. He went with the Egyptian army in the pursuit of the Israelites, and the collapsing Red Sea crushed and drowned him, where he was imprisoned by a pillar of water.

The Testament of Solomon states that Jannes and Jambres called upon Abezethibou when they battled against Moses, and the demon provided them with the magic they used. He claimed to be "the adversary of Moses in [performing] signs and wonders." Abezethibou was sealed in the Red Sea, but Beelzebub claimed that "when he [Abezethibou] is ready, then he will come in triumph."

References

Bibliography 

Fallen angels
Testament of Solomon
Demons in the Old Testament apocrypha
Witchcraft in folklore and mythology